Takua Thung is a district (amphoe) in the Phang Nga province in the south of Thailand.

History
The old city hall was in Ban Khai, Tambon Bang Thong, Thai Mueang district. In 1894 Burmese troops attacked Mueang Takua Pa. Thalang and Takua Thung were the next targets. Then people of Takua Thung moved the city center to Tambon Kra Som, where it is located today. Takua Thung was downgraded to a district of Phang Nga in 1899.

Geography
Neighboring districts are (from the north clockwise) Thai Mueang and Mueang Phang Nga. To the southwest is the Phang Nga Bay, to the south is the district Thalang of Phuket province, separated by the Pak Phra Strait. To the west is the Andaman Sea.

Namtok Raman Forest Park protects a 0.2 km2 area around a scenic waterfall. The park was established on 26 October 1983. Most of the Phang Nga Bay coastline is part of the Ao Phang Nga National Park.

The most important temple within the district is Wat Suwannakhuha, also commonly known as Wat Tham (lit. 'cave temple') due to several caves within a hill inside the temple area. The largest of these caves is decorated with Buddha images as well as stalactites and stalagmites.

Administration 
The district is divided into seven sub-districts (tambons), which are further subdivided into 68 villages (mubans). There are two townships (thesaban tambons) in the district, Krasom and Khok Kloi, each covering parts of the same-named tambon. Each of the tambons is administered by a tambon administrative organization (TAO). The sub-district of Khok Kloi will be the site of the second Phuket International Airport.

External links
Tourist attractions in the district at the Phang Nga province website

Takua Thung